Bursera penicillata is a Mexican species of trees in the frankincense family in the soapwood order. It is widespread in much of Mexico from Sonora and Chihuahua to Oaxaca and Veracruz.

Bursera penicillata is a small tree. Leaves are pinnately compound with 7-9 leaflets.

References

Moc.
penicillata
Flora of Mexico
Plants described in 1824
Taxa named by Martín Sessé y Lacasta
Taxa named by Alphonse Pyramus de Candolle
Taxa named by Adolf Engler